The Agenda Project is a Washington, D.C.-based non-profit political organization.  It was founded in 2010 by political strategist, commentator, and author Erica Payne, founder of the consulting firm The Tesseract Group.  The Agenda Project was founded to connect participants, progressive leaders, and stakeholders to build relationships and to deepen the understanding of progressive ideas and specific policy issues.

Campaigns
The Agenda Project started campaigns such as F*ck Tea, Hate Begets Hate, Vote Sanity, and Patriotic Millionaires for Fiscal Strength. F*ck Tea was launched in the summer of 2010 and included "F*ck Tea" mugs and T-shirts, which on the back read: "Progress is the Real American Party." The campaign was intended to urge Americans to "dismiss the Tea Party and to promote the progressive cause," Erica told Politico.

Republican Cuts Kill Commercial 
On October 12, 2014, AP Action Fund released a 1 minute commercial entitled "Republican Cuts Kill."  The commercial displayed various federal and state elected Republicans saying "cut" alongside the amount of reduction in spending for the Center for Disease Control and National Institute of Health,  "Like rabid dogs in a butcher shop, Republicans have indiscriminately shredded everything in their path, including critical programs that could have dealt with the Ebola crisis before it reached our country. Yesterday, a health worker tested positive for the virus—now, the effects of the GOP's fanatical hatred for our government may finally be exposed," said Erica Payne, president and founder of the progressive Agenda Project Action Fund.

References

External links 
 Practicalprogress.org 
 Agendaproject.org 

Political advocacy groups in the United States
Non-profit organizations based in New York (state)